The Most Venerable Datuk K. Sri Dhammaratana 拿督达摩拉达那长老 (born 24 July 1948) is a Sri Lankan born Malaysian Buddhist monk and the incumbent Buddhist Chief High Priest of Malaysia, since the passing of his predecessor in 2006.

Childhood Memories 
Born into the family of Mr. and Mrs. Basanayaka M. Siriwardena on the 24th of July 1948, in Kirinde, Matara, Sri Lanka. He was named Basanayaka M. Siripala. At the age of 17, he traded paths and in 1965 he was ordained and was given the name K. Dhammaratana. In 1972, he received his higher ordination (Upasampada) at Malwatta Maha Viharaya, Kandy.

Early life 
Like his predecessor, he was born in the village of Kirinde in Matara, Sri Lanka on 24 July 1948, the second of five children of Basnayaka Mudiyanselage Siriwardena, an Ayurvedic physician, and Withanaarachchilage Dayawathie. He completed his secondary education at the Central College of Deyiyandara. Immediately after graduating, he entered monastic life as a novice monk taking the name Kirinde Dhammaratana under the guidance of Venerable Kotawila Sri Deepananda Nayaka Thero. While receiving monastic training, he also studied at Parama Buddhist International University.

About 
In 1980, with the Venerable K. Sri Dhammananda's invitation, he traveled to Malaysia to be a resident monk at the Buddhist Maha Vihara in Kuala Lumpur. He was subsequently appointed the principal of its Sunday Dhamma School in 1988, and served as principal for a year, before vacating the post for a visit to the United States. He resumed his position in 1994 and remained the principal until 2008, when he was promoted to the Spiritual Advisor of the school.

After his return from the United States in 1994, Dhammaratana was instrumental in setting up Ti-Ratana Welfare Society in Salak South Garden with the assistance of his friends, donors and supporters at the Buddhist Maha Vihara, and very soon developed it by adding various sections such as free clinics, orphanage, elderly homes and refugee centres for the neglected children and mothers. On 21 June 1997, The Welfare Society's 1st children's home, with just 12 children was officiated by Tan Sri Datin Paduka Hajjah Zaleha Bt. Ismail, also the Minister of National Unity and Community Development. It is now one of the most established and non-profit organisation in Malaysia.

Dhammmaratana set up a separate affiliated society, Ti-Ratana Buddhist Society, to promote Humanistic Buddhism. The Buddhist Society shares the same locations as the community centres and runs programmes in collaboration with Ti-Ratana Community Centres. The society also runs 5 community centres across the Klang Valley that cater to promoting Malaysian Chinese culture to the community, with Chinese cultural classes teaching Chinese calligraphy and art.

On 12 March 2007 he was appointed as Chief Sangha Nayaka of Malaysia by the Malwatta Chapter of the Siam Nikaya. The Yang di-Pertuan Agong of Malaysia conferred him with a Datuk title in November 2010.

Honorary Titles & Positions 

 The Principal of the Buddhist Institute Sunday Dhamma School (BISDS) in Buddhist Maha Vihara, Brickfields.
 Founder & Spiritual advisor of the Ti-Ratana Welfare Society and Ti-Ratana Buddhist Society.
 Advisor of Sri Subhodharama Kaluwachchimulla, Kuliyapitiya.
 Co-Chairman of the Inter-Faith Group which comprises Spiritual leaders from Islam, Buddhism, Christianity, Hinduism, Taoism and Sikhism.
 Appointed as the Chief Sangha Nayaka of Malaysia (Chief High Priest) and bestowed with the title of Dhammakeerthi Sri Dhammananda by the Board of Malwatta Chapter of Siam Nikaya in Kandy, Sri Lanka.
 Chief Religious Advisor of Buddha Dhamma Fellowship Association Kuching.
 Religious Patron of Young Buddhist Association of Malaysia.
 Board Member of Malaysian Association For The Blind.
 Religious Advisor of UM Buddhist Society and UPM Buddhist Society.

Religious and Welfare Services (Malaysia) 

 Blessing services to the community, the sick, deceased and prison inmates.
 Initiated correspondence course named “Buddhism for YOU” and Chinese Dhamma classes at the Buddhist Institute Sunday Dhamma School.
 Annual Caring and Sharing Programme which caters to about 1200 people comprising senior citizens, orphans and physically handicapped. 
 Founded Ti-Ratana Welfare Society - Homes for Children, elderly and Infirm, abused women and halfway house.
 Free mobile clinic and mobile dental clinic to reach out to the rural communities. Free loan of health care equipment. Distribution of Emergency Food Aid.
 Provide community services - family counseling, language and dhamma classes, various relaxation and recreational activities, distribution of free publications / reading materials, 3-R Campaign (Reduce, Reuse and Recycle).
 Organised sports, holiday camps and seminars for teenagers and youths.

Welfare and Social Services (International) 

 Presenting wheelchairs to soldiers at Ranaviru Sevana and D.A. Rajapaksha Foundation, Sri Lanka.
 Presenting Cardiac and other equipment to Army Hospital, Sri Lanka.
 Renovating Hettiyawala Vidyalaya and paving the roads in Kirinde, Sri Lanka and renaming the school “Kirinde Sri Dhammananda Vidyalaya” and “Kirinde Sri Dhammananda Mawatha” respectively.
 Sending essential food items, clothing and medicines in aid of Tsunami victims in Sri Lanka, Thailand and Indonesia.
 Sending food, clothing and materials in aid of earthquake victims in Pakistan.

References 

1948 births
Malaysian Buddhists
Malaysian Buddhist monks
Sri Lankan Buddhist monks
Theravada Buddhist monks
Malaysian Theravada Buddhists
People from Southern Province, Sri Lanka
Living people
Malaysian people of Sri Lankan descent